Asisipho Plaatjies (born 24 April 1996) is a South African rugby sevens player. She competed for South Africa at the 2022 Commonwealth Games in Birmingham where they finished in seventh place.

References 

Living people
1996 births
Female rugby sevens players
South Africa international women's rugby sevens players
Rugby sevens players at the 2022 Commonwealth Games